Bor Dam, is an earthfill dam on Bor river near Bori in the Bor Wildlife Sanctuary, Seloo Tahsil, Wardha district in State of Maharashtra in India.

Specifications

Purpose
 Irrigation

See also
 Dams in Maharashtra
 List of reservoirs and dams in India

References

Dams in Wardha district
Dams completed in 1965
1965 establishments in Maharashtra